Deben is a British Registration district in Suffolk, England. It is an administrative region which exists for the purpose of civil registration of births, marriages, and deaths and civil partnerships. The Register office for the district is at Woodbridge, Suffolk.

The district was formed on the 1 April 1935 from parts of the Woodbridge, Plomesgate and Mildenhall registration districts. The district includes the following parishes:
Aldeburgh
Alderton
Bawdsey
Blaxhall
Boulge
Boyton
Bredfield
Bromeswell
Burgh
Capel St. Andrew
Charsfield
Chillesford
Clopton
Culpho
Dallinghoo
Dallinghoo Wield
Debach
Foxhall
Gedgrave
Great Bealings
Grundisburgh
Hasketon
Havergate Island
Hollesley
Iken
Kesgrave
Little Bealings
Martlesham
Melton
Orford
Otley
Pettistree
Playford
Purdis Farm
Ramsholt
Rushmere St. Andrew
Shottisham
Stratton Hall
Sudbourne
Sutton
Tuddenham St. Martin
Tunstall
Ufford
Wantisden
Westerfield
Wickham Market
Witnesham
Woodbridge

References

External links
Deben Register Office

Local government in Suffolk